Lambsbach is a river in southwestern Germany. It flows into the Blies near  Homburg.

See also
List of rivers of Rhineland-Palatinate
List of rivers of Saarland

Rivers of Rhineland-Palatinate
Rivers of Saarland
Rivers of Germany